"Megamix '93" is the twenty sixth single by Dutch girl group Luv' released in 1993 by Arcade Records. This Megamix (produced by Dancability) is the comeback record of the original group (Patty Brard, José Hoebee and Marga Scheide) since their 1980 single One More Little Kissie. It appears on the compilation Luv' Gold. The long version of this medley is included as a bonus track on the Box set Completely In Luv'.

Song history
Inspired by the success of the ABBA and Boney M Gold compilations, the original Luv' formation reunited in the spring of 1993, after several line-up changes (with (Marga Scheide being the only member to stay constantly in the group). The trio signed a record deal with Arcade Records for the release of a compilation (entitled Luv' Gold). The promotion campaign of this anthology CD was launched in a notorious Amsterdam gay club (De iT) where the Luv' singers appeared in concert. The compilation topped the Dutch album charts for eighteen weeks and reached the fourteenth position. Luv' hadn't topped an album in the hitlists for nearly thirteen years.

Moreover, the trio scored a hit single on the Dutch Top 40: a megamix produced by Dancability (a project involving Martin Boer (of the famous Dutch Dance act 2 Brothers on the 4th Floor).

This medley is a non-stop dance mix of Luv's greatest chart toppers (U.O.Me (Theme from Waldolala), Trojan Horse, You're the Greatest Lover and Ooh, Yes I Do), whose original versions were smash hits in the late 1970s in a large part of Continental Europe, South Africa and Mexico.

Thanks to their comeback, the ladies often performed on TV (they recorded a special (Discover the world with Luv') aired on Veronica and filmed in the British Virgin Islands). They also toured the club circuit in the Netherlands, Belgium, Germany and Denmark. In 1994, Luv' recorded what turned out to be their final studio album, (All You Need Is Luv'), and soon after disbanded. The disco/pop act made another comeback in 2005–2006.

Chart performance
"Megamix '93" was a top 30 hit in the Netherlands and marked Luv's return to the charts since the single "Welcome to My Party" in 1989 (recorded by another line-up). More than a decade after its international success, the group's situation had changed. From a popular female trio which had hit records three years in a row (1978–1981) in a dozen of countries, Luv' became an act which only caught the attention of the Dutch speaking mass media in the Netherlands and in Flanders (Belgium).

Track listings and formatsCD Single"Megamix '93" (Radio Version) — 2:49
U.O.Me (Waldolala)/Trojan Horse/You're The Greatest Lover/Ooh, Yes I Do
"You're the Greatest Lover 1993"  — 3:18Maxi CD Single'
"Megamix" (Radio Version) — 2:49
U.O.Me (Waldolala)/Trojan Horse/You're The Greatest Lover/Ooh, Yes I Do
"You're the Greatest Lover 1993"  — 3:18
"Megamix"
You're The Greatest Lover/Casanova/Ooh, Yes I Do/Trojan Horse/U.O.Me (Waldolala)
"Megamix '93" (Long Version) — 4:21
U.O.Me (Waldolala)/Trojan Horse/You're The Greatest Lover/Ooh, Yes I Do/Casanova

1993 singles
Luv' songs
Music medleys
Dance-pop songs
Songs written by Hans van Hemert
Songs written by Piet Souer